Gilbert Étienne (22 June 1928 – 17 May 2014) was a Swiss economist, author and professor. Étienne is best known for his extensive publishing on economic subjects related to India, China and Pakistan. He was a professor at the Graduate Institute of International Studies in Geneva for over 30 years.

Early life
Étienne was born in Neuchâtel, Switzerland. His first studies were in law, and he received a degree from the University of Neuchâtel in 1951. Following this, he studied at the National Institute of Oriental Languages and Civilizations (Inalco) in Paris. As a student of Inalco he spent a year doing doctoral research (from 1952 to 1953) in India and Pakistan, where he also spent time teaching in Lahore. In 1955 he defended his doctoral thesis India: economy and population, which was published the following year by Droz.

Academic career
Following his graduation in 1955, he took a two-year trip to India, where he worked as a representative of the Swiss watch company Favre-Leuba. On his return to Switzerland in 1958 he became a lecturer at the Graduate Institute of International Studies (IUHEI) in Geneva, where his research focused on the economic and social questions of developing countries. He became a professor at the same establishment in 1964, after the  publication of his book The Chinese Way. He stayed at IUHEI until the end of his career, in 1994, interrupting his education study tours on the Asian field..From 1979 to 2002 he was the president of the Swiss Association for development aid, Frères de nos frères.

Death and legacy
Étienne died on 17 May 2014 in Geneva. A prolific author, Étienne published over 40 books and 100 journal articles in his lifetime. His final book, Indian Villages Achievements and Alarm Bells, 1952–2012, was published as a posthumous tribute in 2014.

Selected publications 
 2007, China-India: the great competition
 2003, Development against the current
 2002, Unpredictable Afghanistan
 1998, Chine-Inde: le match du siècle
 1996, The Economy of India
 1989, Pakistan, a gift from the Indus: economy and politics
 1988, Food and Poverty:India's Half Won Battle
 1985, Rural development in Asia: Meetings with Peasants
 1982, Rural development in Asia: people, grain and tools
 1974, The Chinese way: the long march of the economy /  La voie chinoise. La longue marche de l'économie, 1949–1974
 1969, A Review of Rural Cooperation in Developing Areas
 1969, Les Chances de l'Inde
 1968, Studies in Indian Agriculture– The Art of the Possible
 1962, Tiers Monde, la voie chinoise
 1959, De Caboul à Pékin: rythmes et perspectives d'expansion économique
 1956, India: economy and population

See also 
 Jean François Billeter
 Gilbert Blardone
 Serge Latouche
 Paul Bairoch

References

External links 
 Gilbert Etienne – Mainstream

1928 births
2014 deaths
20th-century Swiss economists
21st-century Swiss economists
Academic staff of the Graduate Institute of International and Development Studies
National Institute for Oriental Languages and Civilizations people